Serbs began migrating to Sweden in large numbers in the 1960s, as part of the migrant work-agreement signed with the Yugoslav government to help Sweden overcome its severe labour shortage. The Yugoslav Wars saw another influx of Serbs.

History
Serbs constituted a low percentage of the Swedish population prior to the 1960s. Some came after World War II, mostly seeking political asylum. The greatest proportion of Serbs came together with Greeks, Italians and Turks under the visa agreements in times of severe labour shortages or when particular skills were deficient within Sweden, as migrant workers (called arbetskraftsinvandring, see gastarbeiter). During the 1960s and 1970s, agreements were signed with the government of Yugoslavia to help Sweden overcome its severe labour shortage.

Bosnian and Croatian Serbs migrated in another wave during and after the Yugoslav wars. A third wave, of Kosovo Serbs, came during the Kosovo war in 1999.

Demographics
The Swedish census data includes country of birth, but does not include ethnicity, descendants or naturalized people, thus, the total number of ethnic Serbs in Sweden is hard to define. Various estimations include: 80,000; 110,000; 120,000; and 140,000. Aco Dragićević, writing for the Swedish-Serbian newspaper Dijaspora, wrote in 2002 that some 200,000 Yugoslavs, regardless of ethnic origin, migrated to Sweden during the Second Yugoslavia (1945-1992); of these, roughly 40% (ca. 80,000) he believed to be Serbs.

Culture

Language
The Serbs in Sweden are bilingual. The Serbian language is a rich contributor to the so-called Rinkeby Swedish, a sociolect (slang) of the Swedish language.

Religion

In 1972 the first Serbian Orthodox parish (of St. Nicholas) was formed in Västerås, prior to the forming the Serbs were headed by Swedish Orthodox priest Christofer Klasson, previously priest in the Church of Sweden. Later, the same year a parish was formed in Malmö (of Saints Cyrils and Methodius) and in 1973 one in Stockholm (of Saint Sava). Later, parishes have been formed in Göteborg (of Stefan Decanski), Jönköping (of Nativity of Mary), Helsingborg (of St Basil the Great) and one more in Stockholm. The parishes have their own head-priest.

In Malmö, 1982, the Church of Saint Cyril and Methodius was opened, the first Serbian church in Sweden. The parish of Saint Sava opened its church in Enskede, in 1983, the parish in Göteborg also has a church.

The parish in Malmö suffered several attacks in 1990, the premises were firebombed but the church was not damaged, the perpetrators were racist youths who were later convicted of arson.

The SOC has parishes and churches in the cities of:
Stockholm (2)
Church of Saint Sava
Eskilstuna
Västerås
Göteborg
Holy Stefan Decanski church
Jönköping
Kristianstad
Helsingborg
Holy Basil the Great church
Malmö
Church of Saints Cyril and Methodius
Laholm
Smedjeryd monastery

Music
Stockholm-based Östblocket and Macedonian-Swedish Andra Generationen are both Balkan Brass Bands, playing a musical style from southern Serbia.

Sport
Swedish Serbs have been very successful in sports, among most notable are

The Stockholm Eagles is a Serbian-Swedish basketball team that has become very successful since its establishment in 2007. They won the Swedish second league (Basketettan) back to back 2011 and 2012 and became the only team in Sweden to win 34 victories in a row.

Notable people

Sportspeople
Dalibor Doder, handball player
Bojan Djordjic, footballer (AIK, champion 09'), Serbian-born
Alexander Kačaniklić, football player, paternal descent
Alexander Milošević, football player, Serbian father
Dusan Djuric, footballer (FC Zürich, champion 09')
Zoran Lukić, football manager (Djurgårdens IF, champions 02' and 03'), Bosnian-born
Daniel Majstorović, footballer (FC Basel, champion 08')
Marko Mitrović, footballer
Nebojša Novaković, former footballer-assistant manager (AIK, champion 98'), Bosnian-born
Nikola Pasic, ice hockey player, Serbian parents
Peter Popovic, ice hockey player (NHL; Canadiens, Rangers, Penguins and Bruins), Serbian parents
Rade Prica, footballer (Danish Superliga Top scorer: 06–07', Norwegian Premier League Top scorer: 09'), Serb father
Danijela Rundqvist, ice hockey player (Olympic Silver 2006, Bronze 2002), Kosovo Serb mother
Stefan Selaković, footballer (IFK Göteborg, champion 07')
Dragan Umicevic, ice hockey player (NHL; Oilers), Bosnian-born
Ljubomir Vranjes, handball player and multiple champion
Tanja Kostić, basketball player
Robert Kronberg, hurdler, Serbian mother
Susanne Nilsson, football player

TV and Music
Alina Devecerski, singer, Serbian father
Oscar Dronjak, guitarist of power-metal band HammerFall
Katerina Kazelis, singer, Serbian mother
Dragomir Mrsic, actor, Bosnian-born
Jovan Radomir, Swedish television presenter
Michaela Savić, Swedish beauty pageant titleholder and model
Sven Stojanović, television director, directed several Eurovision Song Contest
Nikola Šarčević, punk rock musician
 Cedomir Glisovic, actor

Other
Dragan Joksović, crime boss
Ratko Đokić, crime boss

See also

 Serbian Orthodox Eparchy of Britain and Scandinavia
 Serbs in Norway

References

External links
Association of Serbs in Sweden 
Diaspora, Swedish-Serb organisation

 
Serbian Orthodox Church in Sweden
Serbs
Sweden
Sweden
Sweden
Sweden